Françoise Briand (born 20 April 1951) is a French politician who was Member of Parliament for Essonne's 7th constituency from 2008 to 2012.

References 

Living people
1951 births
Union for a Popular Movement politicians
People from Essonne

Politicians from Paris
Deputies of the 13th National Assembly of the French Fifth Republic
French women engineers
21st-century French women politicians
21st-century French politicians
Women members of the National Assembly (France)